Volleyball at the 2004 Summer Olympics consisted of indoor volleyball held at the Peace and Friendship Stadium and beach volleyball held at the Faliro Olympic Beach Volleyball Centre, in the southern portion of the Roth Pavilion; both were located at the Faliro Coastal Zone Olympic Complex.

Medal table

Medal summary

References

External links
Volleyball
FIVB
Official result book – Beach Volleyball
Official result book – Volleyball

 
O
O
2004 Summer Olympics events
2004